A Clever Dummy is a 1917 American short comedy film directed by Ferris Hartman, Robert P. Kerr, Herman C. Raymaker, and Mack Sennett.

Cast
Ben Turpin as A romantic janitor
Chester Conklin as A playful property man
Wallace Beery as A vaudeville manager
Juanita Hansen as A leading lady
Claire Anderson as An object of affection
James Donnelly as Her inventive father
James Delano as His interested partner
Joseph Belmont as Bald Husband in Audience (uncredited)
Robert Milliken as Master of Ceremonies (uncredited)
Marvel Rea (Minor Role) (uncredited)
Eva Thatcher as Wife in Audience (uncredited)

External links

1917 films
American silent short films
American black-and-white films
1917 comedy films
Silent American comedy films
1917 short films
American comedy short films
Films directed by Herman C. Raymaker
Films directed by Robert P. Kerr
Films directed by Mack Sennett
1910s American films